Kendrick Lewis (born June 16, 1988) is a former American football free safety. He played college football at Mississippi and was drafted by the Kansas City Chiefs in the fifth round of the 2010 NFL Draft. He also played for the Houston Texans, Baltimore Ravens, and Tennessee Titans.

Professional career

Kansas City Chiefs

Lewis was selected by the Kansas City Chiefs with the 136th overall pick in the 2010 NFL Draft. The Chiefs officially signed him on June 29, 2010. He began his rookie season as the backup free safety behind Jon McGraw but took over the starting position after McGraw became injured. He started ten games, intercepting three passes, and forcing one fumble.

In 2011, Lewis started all 16 games at safety for the first time in his career and produced 58 tackles, a career-high 10 passes defensed and three interceptions.

Houston Texans
On March 21, 2014, Lewis signed with the Houston Texans. He established a career-high and led the Texans with 84 tackles and three forced fumbles. He also notched two interceptions, six passes defensed and a fumble recovery.

Baltimore Ravens
On March 14, 2015, Lewis signed a three-year contract with the Baltimore Ravens. He was placed on injured reserve on October 22, 2016.

On March 7, 2017, Lewis was released by the Ravens.

Tennessee Titans
On May 2, 2018, Lewis signed with the Tennessee Titans after sitting out the entire 2017 season. Lewis played in 13 games while starting 3. He finished the 2018 season with 27 tackles and 1 pass defense.

References

External links
Ole Miss Rebels bio
Kansas City Chiefs bio
Houston Texans bio
Baltimore Ravens bio
Tennessee Titans bio

1988 births
Living people
Players of American football from New Orleans
American football safeties
Ole Miss Rebels football players
Kansas City Chiefs players
Houston Texans players
Baltimore Ravens players
Tennessee Titans players